The  was a Japanese freight-only railway line between Akita Kitakō Freight Terminal and Mukaihama Freight Terminal via Akita Port (Akitakō) Station, all within Akita, Akita. This was the only railway line  operated. The third sector company was founded in 1970. The services on the line were divided by Akitakō Station. The North Line mainly transported containers of paper products from Nippon Daishōwa Paperboard Tōhoku, while the South Line transported sulfuric acid from Kosaka Smelting & Refining, via the Kosaka Line.

The railway was discontinued on March 31, 2021.

Basic data

North Line
 Akitakō - Akita-Kitakō
Distance: 2.5 km

South Line
 Akitakō - Mukaihama
Distance: 5.4 km

See also
List of railway companies in Japan
List of railway lines in Japan

References

External links
 Akita Rinkai Railway official website 

Railway lines in Japan
Rail transport in Akita Prefecture
1067 mm gauge railways in Japan
Companies based in Akita Prefecture